Rachel Lindsey Potter (born August 21, 1984) is an American singer and actress. She is most known for her performances on Broadway as Wednesday Addams in The Addams Family, the Mistress in the Tony-nominated revival of Evita, and being a finalist on season 3 of The X Factor.

Early life
Potter was born in New Orleans, Louisiana, but was raised in Seminole, Florida.

Potter has lived in Orlando, Florida, but currently lives in Nashville, Tennessee. At the age of 12, Rachel began writing original songs to cope with her mother being diagnosed with type 1 diabetes. While working at Disney World, she completed a bachelor's degree in public relations and advertising from the University of Central Florida in 2008. After graduating from college she moved to New York where she got a job singing in a wedding band.

Broadway career
In 2003, Potter moved to Orlando, Florida.

Following a friend's suggestion, she auditioned for a singing job at Walt Disney World. Having never been to a theatrical audition before, Rachel came with a headshot (a picture of her singing into a microphone) and a resume with details of her tenure as an employee at the GAP.

Potter was cast as Ariel in the Voyage of the Little Mermaid. She subsequently performed as Belle in Beauty and the Beast, Nemo in Finding Nemo: The Musical, and a slew of other shows at Disney. In 2008, she made it in the Top 15 in the MTV reality show Legally Blonde: The Musical – The Search for Elle Woods.

Potter played Wednesday Addams in the musical version of The Addams Family. Later on, Potter was cast in the 2012 revival of Evita, in which she portrayed Peron's mistress, alongside Ricky Martin, Elena Roger, and Michael Cerveris.

Recording career
Potter began her career as a recording artist at age 16 when she was signed to contemporary Christian label Narrow Door Records. In 2002, she released "Come Back Home", an album of 10 of her own songs.

She appeared in the second national tour of the musical Wicked, as a part of the ensemble, in addition to being an understudy for Glinda. While on tour, she reconnected with Justin York, an old friend who had become a Nashville musician, producer and songwriter, known for his work with Nashville-bred rock band Paramore. Potter released her first EP, Live the Dream.

She raised funds through an incredibly successful Kickstarter campaign to record her dream country project. The "Help Me Live the Dream" concept resonated with people from near and far who helped Potter to exceed the original financial goal. The official music video for "Live the Dream" was released on October 17, 2012, on Potter's channel. Potter performed on CBS New York singing "Hold On To Me".

Potter began performing a series of concerts at Joe's Pub to promote Live the Dream, she performed with Constantine Maroulis, Ricky Martin, Elena Roger, Michael Cerveris, The Vanity Belles, and The Country Band. Potter's unreleased single "The Verdict" was nominated for Best Country Song in the Independent Music Awards. Potter was featured in mashup of Taylor Swift's "I Knew You Were Trouble" and Justin Bieber's "As Long As You Love Me" by VoicePlay, an Orlando-based 5-member a cappella group as well as VoicePlay's cover of "Chandelier" and "The Phantom of the Opera".

In 2014, Potter launched a crowdfunded campaign using Pledge Music to fund her most recent album, Not So Black and White. She released the first single, "Boomerang," a duet with Anthem Lights member Joey Stamper, in October 2014. The full album was released on March 3, 2015. CMT featured her music videos for "Boomerang" and "Tail Lights" on their CMT Pure Channel in the "New Artist Spotlight".

The X Factor

Potter auditioned for the third season of The X Factor with "Somebody to Love". Potter was picked in the Final 40, one of ten acts in the "Over 25" category mentored by Kelly Rowland chosen to move on to the next stage of the competition. Potter sang "Irreplaceable" and was placed in chair 4. Since she was not switched out, she made the final four of "Over 25" category along with Lillie McCloud, Jeff Gutt and James Kenney.

During the first live results show, on October 29, Potter sang "I Hope You Dance" receiving positive reviews; Kelly described Rachel as a "powerhouse and a delight", Paulina says Rachel has a "beautiful tone" and is original, describing the performance as brilliant from beginning to end and Simon said the song choice was perfect and she was even better than Lillie.

She was the first to be chosen to be in the final three along with Jeff Gutt and Lillie McCloud.

During week two, Potter sang "This Old Heart of Mine (Is Weak for You)", gaining mixed reviews; Demi said, "You're so energetic and you bring so much to the stage." but Simon Cowell disliked it.

Due to graphics errors in which incorrect voting numbers were displayed on screen during the performance recap, there was no elimination that week; instead all the acts performed their "Save Me" songs on Thursday night and a public re-vote was conducted after the show.

Potter sang "Anyway" by Martina McBride. During week 3, Potter sang "Alone" by Heart, gaining positive reviews. Potter fell to the bottom two alongside Khaya Cohen, where she was eliminated after only Rowland voted against Cohen. However, Potter received more votes than Cohen meaning if the result went to deadlock, Potter would've been saved.

Performances on The X Factor

Rachel performed the following songs on The X Factor:

Artistry
Potter cites as her influences The Civil Wars, Carrie Underwood, Trisha Yearwood, Faith Hill, The Chicks, Rascal Flatts, Dolly Parton, Joni Mitchell, Patsy Cline, Alison Krauss, Union Station, Martina McBride, Miranda Lambert, Taylor Swift, Grace Potter and the Nocturnals, Sara Bareilles and Sheryl Crow. Growing up, she listened primarily to rock 'n roll because her parents were in a rock band. Originally a CCM artist, Potter now considers herself a Country and country pop artist, but her music contains elements of CCM, Soul pop, Hard rock and pop rock. She describes her music as a fusion of "Country, pop rock, and pop country with a rock edge".

Personal life
Rachel Potter lives in New York with her husband and two sons.

Stage

Discography
Solo Discography
Come Back Home (2002) 
Live the Dream – EP (2012)
Simply Christmas – EP (2014)
Not So Black and White (2015)
Music City Christmas – EP (2018)

Solo Singles

 Blank Space – 2014
 Let It Go – 2014
 Hello (feat. Jake Barker) – 2015
 Want to Want Me / I Wanna Dance With Somebody – 2015
 Four Five Seconds – 2015
 I’m Not the Only One – 2015
 Lover, You Matter to Me (feat. Marty Thomas) – 2020

Discography with Steel Union

 Rachel Potter & Steel Union – EP (2018)

Discography with VoicePlay

 I Knew You Were Trouble / As Long As You Love Me – Single (2013)
 Chandelier – Single (2014)
 The Phantom of the Opera – Single (2015)
 Attention – Single (2017)
 Moana – Medley (2017)
 O Holy Night – Single (2018)
 The Little Mermaid – Medley (2020)
 Kidnap the Sandy Claws – Single (2020)
 Wicked – Medley (2021)
 The Greatest Showman – Medley (2021)

References

External links

American women singer-songwriters
American women country singers
American country singer-songwriters
American Internet celebrities
21st-century American singers
American performers of Christian music
Living people
Singer-songwriters from Louisiana
Singer-songwriters from Florida
1984 births
University of Central Florida alumni
American musical theatre actresses
The X Factor (American TV series) contestants
21st-century American women singers
Country musicians from Louisiana
Country musicians from Florida